Kobi Scherer (20 April 1931 – 1970) was a Swiss cyclist. He competed in the individual and team road race events at the 1952 Summer Olympics.

References

External links
 

1931 births
1970 deaths
Swiss male cyclists
Olympic cyclists of Switzerland
Cyclists at the 1952 Summer Olympics
Place of birth missing